Pramadea denticulata is a moth in the family Crambidae. It was described by Frederic Moore in 1888. It is found in north-eastern India.

References

Moths described in 1888
Moths of Asia
Spilomelinae
Taxa named by Frederic Moore